Rene Lavan (born November 5, 1968) is a Cuban-American actor.

Early life 
Lavan was born in Artemisa, Havana Province, Cuba. In 1980, at the age of 11, he was part of the Mariel boatlift.

Career 
In 1996, he appeared as Gustavo in the acclaimed independent film Azúcar amarga directed by Leon Ichaso. He has also appeared on the long-running ABC soap opera, One Life to Live as Javier Pérez (1995–96, 1997). He has also acted in the telenovela genre appearing in Morelia (1995), and in the Venevision produced Enamorada (1999). In 2001, he appeared as the male lead in Televisa's María Belén.

He has appeared in several publications such as People en Español, Vanidades and Harper's Bazaar. In the last few years, Lavan's television appearances have been on the popular CBS drama, CSI: Miami (2003), on NBC's, Las Vegas (2004), and in the film Dirty Dancing: Havana Nights (2004). He also appeared in Christmas with the Kranks (2004) alongside Tim Allen and Jamie Lee Curtis. He has also co-hosted programs such as the "Latin Billboard Music Awards", "the Latin Grammy's", among others.

He also debuted on Broadway with the long running Latinologues along with Rick Najera and Mexican actor Eugenio Derbez. He is a producer working on various independent projects including music videos and Latin culture-themed films. Additionally, he was formerly named to the board of directors for Fuego Entertainment, a Miami-based Latin-entertainment company that is public under OTC:BB FUGO.

He is in Guerrilla alongside Benicio del Toro coming in 2008 and is also filming an independent movie about Dr. Ricardo Saca, called Flights of Fancy also starring María Conchita Alonso. He also starred in Every Witch Way as Francisco Alonso.

Filmography

Film

Television

External links

1968 births
American male film actors
American male television actors
Cuban emigrants to the United States
Living people
American entertainers of Cuban descent